The 1987 NBA playoffs was the postseason tournament of the National Basketball Association's 1986–87 season. The tournament concluded with the Western Conference champion Los Angeles Lakers defeating the Eastern Conference champion Boston Celtics 4 games to 2 in the NBA Finals. The Lakers earned their 10th NBA championship, and Magic Johnson was named NBA Finals MVP for a then-record third time.

This was the last time the Celtics would appear in the NBA Finals until 2008. Boston only advanced as far as the Conference Finals twice in that stretch: losing the following year to the Detroit Pistons in six games and in 2002 to the New Jersey Nets, also in 6 games.

The Pistons appearance in the Eastern Conference Finals was the franchise's first (and their first Division/Conference Final appearance since 1962). It would be the first of five straight Conference Finals appearances for Detroit. They would make their first NBA Finals appearance since 1956 the following season, the first of 3 straight trips to the Finals (winning the last 2).

The Warriors & Pacers made their first playoff appearances since 1977 and 1981 respectively. The Pacers also won their first NBA playoff game, in Game 3 of their first-round series against the Hawks.

Game 5 of the Philadelphia/Milwaukee series would the final game in the amazing career of Julius Erving.

By beating Dallas 3–1, the SuperSonics became the first #7 seed to defeat a #2 seed since the playoffs expanded to 16 teams in 1984. They reached the Western Conference Finals, where they were swept by the Lakers. The 1989 & 1991 Warriors, 1998 Knicks and 2010 Spurs were the other 7th seeds to beat the 2nd seed.

One of the most memorable moments of the playoffs occurred in the final moments of Game 5 of the Eastern Conference Finals when, with Boston down 107-106, Isiah Thomas had his inbounds pass stolen by Larry Bird, who passed to Dennis Johnson for the game-winning layup.

The only dent in the Lakers' run to the Finals came in Game 4 of the Western Conference Semifinals against the Warriors, when Sleepy Floyd scored a playoff record 39 points in the second half, with a record 29 coming in the fourth quarter, to seal a 129-121 win. Both records still stand.

Bracket

First round

Eastern Conference first round

(1) Boston Celtics vs. (8) Chicago Bulls 

This was the third playoff meeting between these two teams, with the Celtics winning the first two meetings.

(2) Atlanta Hawks vs. (7) Indiana Pacers 

This was the first playoff meeting between the Hawks and the Pacers.

(3) Detroit Pistons vs. (6) Washington Bullets 

This was the first playoff meeting between the Pistons and the Bullets.

(4) Milwaukee Bucks vs. (5) Philadelphia 76ers 

 Jack Sikma gets his shot blocked, jumps back up, catches the ball in mid-air and line-drives it in with 2 seconds left for the game-winner.

 Julius Erving's final NBA game.

This was the seventh playoff meeting between these two teams, with the 76ers winning four of the first six meetings.

Western Conference first round

(1) Los Angeles Lakers vs. (8) Denver Nuggets 

 Magic Johnson hits an 88-foot shot at the buzzer to end the first half.

This was the third playoff meeting between these two teams, with the Lakers winning the first two meetings.

(2) Dallas Mavericks vs. (7) Seattle SuperSonics 

 Seattle becomes first 7th seeded team to eliminate 2nd seeded team since Playoffs moved to 16-team format in 1984.

This was the second playoff meeting between these two teams, with the Mavericks winning the first meeting.

(3) Portland Trail Blazers vs. (6) Houston Rockets 

This was the first playoff meeting between the Rockets and the Trail Blazers.

(4) Utah Jazz vs. (5) Golden State Warriors 

This was the first playoff meeting between the Warriors and the Jazz.

Conference Semifinals

Eastern Conference Semifinals

(1) Boston Celtics vs. (4) Milwaukee Bucks

This was the fifth playoff meeting between these two teams, with the Celtics winning three of the first four meetings.

(2) Atlanta Hawks vs. (3) Detroit Pistons

 Isiah Thomas makes the game-winning layup with 1 second left.

This was the fifth playoff meeting between these two teams, with the Hawks winning three of the first four meetings. It is the first win for the Pistons since the franchise moved to Detroit.

Western Conference semifinals

(1) Los Angeles Lakers vs. (5) Golden State Warriors

 Sleepy Floyd's record 39-point 2nd half and 29-point 4th quarter.

This was the sixth playoff meeting between these two teams, with the Lakers winning four of the first five meetings.

(6) Houston Rockets vs. (7) Seattle SuperSonics

This was the second playoff meeting between these two teams, with the SuperSonics winning the first meeting.

Conference finals

Eastern Conference finals

(1) Boston Celtics vs. (3) Detroit Pistons

 Larry Bird steals Isiah Thomas' inbound pass and gives the ball to Dennis Johnson, who hits the game-winning lay-up with 1 second left.

This was the third playoff meeting between these two teams, with the Celtics winning the first two meetings.

Western Conference finals

(1) Los Angeles Lakers vs. (7) Seattle SuperSonics

 Michael Cooper's game-saving block on Dale Ellis with 35 seconds left.

This was the fourth playoff meeting between these two teams, with the SuperSonics winning two of the first three meetings.

NBA Finals: (W1) Los Angeles Lakers vs. (E1) Boston Celtics

 Michael Cooper hits six 3-pointers.

 Magic Johnson hits the game-winning "Baby-Hook" with 2 seconds left.

 Bill Walton's final NBA game.

This was the tenth playoff meeting between these two teams, with the Celtics winning eight of the first nine meetings.

References

External links
 Basketball-Reference.com's 1987 NBA Playoffs page

National Basketball Association playoffs
Playoffs
Sports in Portland, Oregon

fi:NBA-kausi 1986–1987#Pudotuspelit